Observatory Ridge is the highest point in Johannesburg, South Africa. It is in the suburb of Observatory.

There is a large sandstone monument on top of the ridge that commemorates the British Indian Army. The monument bears the inscription: "To the memory of British Officers, Natives, NCOs and Men, Veterinary Assistants, Nalbands, and Followers of the Indian Army".

References 

Geography of Johannesburg
Tourist attractions in Johannesburg